The 2020–21 season will be SC Pick Szeged's 45th competitive and consecutive season in the Nemzeti Bajnokság I and 59th year in existence as a handball club.

Players

Squad information

Goalkeepers
1  Barnabás Marczinka
 16  Roland Mikler
 32  Mirko Alilović
 77  Luka Krivokapić
Left Wingers
8  Jonas Källman (c)
 10  Stefán Rafn Sigurmannsson
 39  Brúnó Bajusz
 42  Martin Straňovský
Right Wingers
 13  Dániel Kecskés
 17  Bogdan Radivojević
 24  Mario Šoštarič
 93  Benjámin Szilágyi
Line players
 22  Matej Gaber
 27  Bence Bánhidi
 45  Miklós Rosta
 23  József Tóth

Left Backs
9  Richárd Bodó
 15  Nik Henigman
 51  Borut Mačkovšek
 90  Dániel Fekete
 91  Patrik Hegedűs
Central Backs
 14  Joan Cañellas
 23  Bence Vetési
 35  Barnabás Rea
 44  Dean Bombač
 89  Dmitry Zhitnikov
Right Backs
7  Luka Stepančić
 37  Stanislav Kašpárek

Competitions

Overview

References

External links
 
 MOL-Pick Szeged at eurohandball.com

SC Pick Szeged seasons
SC Pick Szeged